Ben Martin (September 16, 1930 – February 10, 2017) was a Time photographer who captured "evocative images that defined the 1960s" in the United States, according to the New York Times.

He died on February 10, 2017, at his home in Salisbury, North Carolina, due to complications from pulmonary fibrosis, according to his former wife, actress Kathryn Leigh Scott.

References

External links 
In 1965, ‘Yankee’ photographer Martin met Alabama justice (Salisbury Post)
Picture perfect: Photojournalist Ben Martin had life covered (Salisbury Post)

American photojournalists
1930 births
2017 deaths
20th-century photographers
People from Salisbury, North Carolina